Kamareh-ye Gharbi (also Romanized as Kamareh-ye Gharbī; also known as Kamārah and Kamareh) is a village in Shiyan Rural District, in the Central District of Eslamabad-e Gharb County, Kermanshah Province, Iran. At the 2006 census, its population was 220, in 47 families.

References 

Populated places in Eslamabad-e Gharb County